The 15th Airlift Squadron is part of the 437th Airlift Wing at Charleston Air Force Base, South Carolina. It operates Boeing C-17 Globemaster III aircraft supporting the United States Air Force global reach mission worldwide.

Mission
The 15th Airlift Squadron, "Global Eagles", provides combat-ready C-17 aircrews for strategic airlift missions worldwide.  The squadron is tasks include emergency nuclear airlift, Presidential support and humanitarian relief efforts.

History

World War II
Constituted 15th Transport Squadron on 20 Nov 1940. Activated on 4 Dec 1940 at Duncan Field, TX, and was assigned to the 61st Transport (later, 61st Troop Carrier) Group. The squadron flew the C-33 and then C-39 between 1941 and 1942. Converted to Douglas C-47 Skytrains in early 1942, trained under I Troop Carrier Command for combat operations. Redesignated 15th Troop Carrier Squadron on 4 Jul 1942.

Post WW2
Reactivated on 30 Sep 1946. Redesignated: 15th Troop Carrier Squadron, Medium, Eschborn AB, Germany. Then, relocated to Rhein-Main AB, Germany, on 9 February 1947, it was redesignated as the 15th Troop Carrier Squadron, Medium, on 1 July 1948.

The 15th moved to McChord AFB, WA, on 26 July 1950, before relocating to Ashiya AB, Japan on 13 December 1950. During the Korean War it provided aerial transportation from the US to Japan, from August–December 1950, and between Japan and Korea, from 13 December 1950-November 1952. The squadron relocated from Tachikawa AB, Japan, relocating there on 26 March 1952, to Larson AFB, WA, on 21 November 1952. During 1952 also saw the 15th transition to the C-124 aircraft, and the following year, the squadron was tasked was tasked with providing worldwide airlift.

The squadron moved to Donaldson AFB, SC on 25 August 1954, before being reassigned to the 63rd Troop Carrier Group on 8 October 1959, and to the 63rd Troop Carrier (later, 63rd Military Airlift) Wing, on 18 January 1963. The unit relocated to Hunter AFB, GA, on 1 April 1963. The squadron was redesignated as the 15th Military Airlift Squadron on 8 January 1966.

Global airlift
The 15th relocated to Norton AFB, CA, on 1 April 1967. That same year, it transitioned to the C-141. The squadron was reassigned to the 63rd Military Airlift Group, on 1 October 1978; and to the 63rd Military Airlift Wing, on 1 July 1980. The squadron provided airlift to Southeast Asia, 1966–1973; and to Grenada, Operation Urgent Fury, from October–November 1983; to Panama, Operation Just Cause, from 18 December 1989 – 8 January 1990; and to Southwest Asia, from August 1990-January 1991.

Redesignated as the 15th Airlift Squadron on 1 January 1992 under the 63rd Operations Group, the 15th inactivated on 26 July 1993.

The squadron reactivated on 1 October 1993 at Joint Base Charleston, SC, and was assigned to the 437th Operations Group. The 15th received its first C-17 in June 1993.

Lineage
 Constituted as the 15th Transport Squadron on 20 November 1940
 Activated on 4 December 1940
 Redesignated 15th Troop Carrier Squadron on 4 July 1942
 Inactivated on 31 July 1945
 Activated on 30 September 1946
 Redesignated 15th Troop Carrier Squadron, Medium on 1 July 1948
 Redesignated 15th Troop Carrier Squadron, Heavy on 15 August 1948
 Redesignated 15th Military Airlift Squadron on 8 January 1966
 Redesignated 15th Airlift Squadron on 1 January 1992
 Inactivated on 26 July 1993
 Activated on 1 October 1993

Assignments
 61st Transport Group (later 61st Troop Carrier Group), 4 December 1940 – 31 July 1945
 61st Troop Carrier Group, 30 September 1946
 63d Troop Carrier Group, 8 October 1959
 63d Troop Carrier Wing (later 63d Military Airlift Wing), 18 January 1963
 63d Military Airlift Group, 1 October 1978
 63d Military Airlift Wing, 1 July 1980
 63d Operations Group, 1 January 1992 – 26 July 1993
 437th Operations Group, 1 October 1993 – present

Stations

 Duncan Field, Texas, 4 December 1940
 Augusta Airport, Georgia, 12 July 1941
 Pope Field, North Carolina, 24 May 1942
 Lubbock Army Air Field, Texas, 15 November 1942
 Pope Field, North Carolina, 26 February–30 April 1943
 Lourmel Airfield, Algeria, 15 May 1943
 Kairouan Airfield, Tunisia, 21 June 1943
 Licata Airfield, Sicily, 3 September 1943
 Sciacca Airfield, Sicily, 6 October 1943 – 12 February 1944
 RAF Barkston Heath (AAF-483), England, 18 February 1944
 Abbeville/Drucat Airfield (B-92), France, 13 March–19 May 1945

 Waller Field, Trinidad, 19 May–31 July 1945
 AAF Station Eschborn, Germany, 30 September 1946
 AAF Station Frankfurt, Germany, 9 February 1947 – 21 July 1950
 McChord Air Force Base, Washington, 26 July–4 December 1950
 Ashiya Air Base, Japan, 13 December 1950
 Tachikawa Air Base, Japan, 26 March–18 November 1952
 Larson Air Force Base, Washington, 21 November 1952
 Donaldson Air Force Base, South Carolina, 25 August 1954
 Hunter Air Force Base, Georgia, 1 April 1963
 Norton Air Force Base, California, 1 April 1967 – 26 July 1993
 Charleston Air Force Base, South Carolina, 1 October 1993 – present

Aircraft

 Douglas C-33 (1941)
 Douglas C-39 (1941–1942)
 Douglas C-47 Skytrain (1942–1945, 1946–1948)
 Douglas C-54 Skymaster (1948–1952)

 Douglas C-124 Globemaster II (1952–1967)
 Lockheed C-141 Starlifter (1967–1997)
 Boeing C-17 Globemaster III (1997–present)

Awards and campaigns
 Campaigns. World War II: Sicily; Naples-Foggia; Normandy; Northern France; Rhineland; Central Europe. Korea: CCF Intervention; First UN Counteroffensive; CCF Spring Offensive; UN Summer-Fall Offensive; Second Korean Winter; Korean Summer-Fall, 1952.
 Decorations. Distinguished Unit Citations: Sicily, 11 July 1943; France, [6–7] Jun 1944; Korea, 13 December 1950 – 21 April 1951. Air Force Outstanding Unit Awards: 1 July 1957 – 10 December 1962; 1 July 1968 – 30 June 1969; 1 July 1970 – 30 June 1971; 1 June 1978 – 31 May 1980; 1 Jan-31 Dec 1983; 1 Jan-31 Dec 1987; 1 January 1990 – 30 April 1991. Republic of Korea Presidential Unit Citation: 1 Jul 1951–[18 Nov 1952]. Republic of Vietnam Gallantry Cross with Palm: 1 April 1966 – 8 January 1973.

References

Notes

Bibliography

External links
 15th Airlift Squadron Home Page

0015
Military units and formations in South Carolina